Delta Alpha Pi may refer to:

Delta Alpha Pi (honor society), an honor society founded in 2004 for those with disabilities
Delta Alpha Pi (social), a social fraternity founded in 1919 which merged with Phi Mu Delta